The 2014 Australian Open was a tennis tournament that took place at Melbourne Park between 13 and 26 January 2014. It was the 102nd edition of the Australian Open, and the first Grand Slam tournament of the year. The tournament consisted of events for professional players in singles, doubles and mixed doubles play. Junior and wheelchair players competed in singles and doubles tournaments.

Li Na won the women's singles, beating Dominika Cibulková in the final. Stanislas Wawrinka defeated Rafael Nadal in the men's singles final to win his first grand slam title. Sara Errani and Roberta Vinci defended their women's doubles title with a victory over Ekaterina Makarova and Elena Vesnina. Łukasz Kubot and Robert Lindstedt took the men's doubles title with a victory over Eric Butorac and Raven Klaasen. The mixed doubles were won by Kristina Mladenovic and Daniel Nestor, with Sania Mirza and Horia Tecău the runners-up.

Both defending singles champions lost in the quarterfinals, the first time in the open era. Novak Djokovic was the three-time defending champion in the men's singles, but failed to defend his title, losing to eventual champion Wawrinka. Two-time defending champion Victoria Azarenka also failed to defend her title in the women's singles, losing to Agnieszka Radwańska. In addition, the men's doubles defending champions Bob & Mike Bryan also failed to defend their title, while Errani and Vinci managed to retain their title. As in previous years, this tournament's title sponsor was Kia.

Tournament

The 2014 Australian Open was the 102nd edition of the tournament and was held at Melbourne Park in Melbourne, Victoria, Australia.

The tournament was run by the International Tennis Federation (ITF) and was part of the 2014 ATP World Tour and the 2014 WTA Tour calendars under the Grand Slam category. The tournament consisted of both men's and women's singles and doubles draws as well as a mixed doubles event. There were singles and doubles events for both boys and girls (players under 18), which is part of the Grade A category of tournaments, and also singles, doubles and quad events for men's and women's wheelchair tennis players as part of the NEC tour under the Grand Slam category.

The tournament was played on hard courts and took place over a series of 16 courts, including the three main showcourts: Rod Laver Arena, Hisense Arena and Margaret Court Arena. The latter was undergoing refurbishment, as part of the Melbourne Park Redevelopment project.

Broadcast
In Australia, all matches were broadcast live by the Seven Network. The majority of matches were shown on the network's primary channel Channel Seven, however during news programming nationwide and most night matches in Perth, coverage shifted to 7Two. Coverage was presented by Johanna Griggs, Jim Wilson, Matt White, Hamish McLachlan and Basil Zempilas, with commentary from Bruce McAvaney, Jim Courier, Sam Smith, Todd Woodbridge, John Newcombe, Rennae Stubbs, Henri Leconte and John Fitzgerald. Lleyton Hewitt, who was competing in the tournament, would become a commentator if he is knocked out. Some outside court matches were shown on Fox Sports on Foxtel.

Point and prize money distribution

Point distribution
Below is a series of tables for each of the competitions showing the ranking points on offer for each event.

Senior points

Wheelchair points

Junior points

Prize money
The Australian Open total prize money for 2014 was increased by three million Australian dollars to tournament record A$33,000,000.

1Qualifiers prize money is also the Round of 128 prize money.
*per team

Singles players
2014 Australian Open – Men's singles

2014 Australian Open – Women's singles

Day-by-day summaries

Champions

Seniors

Men's singles

  Stan Wawrinka defeated  Rafael Nadal, 6–3, 6–2, 3–6, 6–3
• It was Wawrinka's 1st career Major title.

Women's singles

  Li Na defeated  Dominika Cibulková, 7–6(7–3), 6–0
• It was Li's 2nd and last career Major title and her 1st and only title in Australian Open.

Men's doubles

  Łukasz Kubot /  Robert Lindstedt defeated  Eric Butorac /  Raven Klaasen, 6–3, 6–3
• It was Kubot and Lindstedt's 1st career Major doubles title.

Women's doubles

  Sara Errani /  Roberta Vinci defeated  Ekaterina Makarova /  Elena Vesnina, 6–4, 3–6, 7–5
• It was Errani and Vinci's 4th career Major doubles title and their 2nd respective title in Australian Open.

Mixed doubles

  Kristina Mladenovic /  Daniel Nestor defeated  Sania Mirza /  Horia Tecău, 6–3, 6–2
• It was Nestor's 8th career Major mixed doubles title and his 4th title in Australian Open.
• It was Mladenovic's 3rd career Major mixed doubles title and her 1st title in Australian Open.

Juniors

Boys' singles

  Alexander Zverev defeated  Stefan Kozlov, 6–3, 6–0

Girls' singles

  Elizaveta Kulichkova defeated  Jana Fett, 6–2, 6–1

Boys' doubles

  Lucas Miedler /  Bradley Mousley defeated  Quentin Halys /  Johan Sébastien Tatlot, 6–4, 6–3

Girls' doubles

  Anhelina Kalinina /  Elizaveta Kulichkova defeated  Katie Boulter /  Ivana Jorović, 6–4, 6–2

Legends

Legends' men doubles

  Todd Woodbridge /  Mark Woodforde defeated  Jonas Björkman /  Thomas Enqvist, 4–6, 6–2, [13–11]

Legends women's doubles

  Nicole Bradtke /  Rennae StubbsWheelchair events

Wheelchair men's singles

  Shingo Kunieda defeated  Gustavo Fernández, 6–0, 6–1

Wheelchair women's singles

  Sabine Ellerbrock defeated  Yui Kamiji, 3–6, 6–4, 6–2

Wheelchair quad singles

  David Wagner defeated  Lucas Sithole, 3–6, 7–5, 6–3

Wheelchair men's doubles

  Stéphane Houdet /  Shingo Kunieda defeated  Gordon Reid /  Maikel Scheffers, 6–3, 6–3

Wheelchair women's doubles

  Yui Kamiji /  Jordanne Whiley defeated  Marjolein Buis /  Jiske Griffioen, 6–2, 6–7, 6–2

Wheelchair quad doubles

  Andrew Lapthorne /  David Wagner' defeated  Dylan Alcott /  Lucas Sithole, 6–4, 6–4

Singles seeds
The following are the seeded players and notable players who withdrew from the event. Seeding are arranged according to ATP and WTA rankings on 6 January 2014, while ranking and points before'' are as of 13 January 2014.

Men's singles

† The player did not qualify for the tournament in 2013. Accordingly, points for his 18th best result are deducted instead.

The following players would have been seeded, but they withdrew before the event.

Women's singles

The following player would have been seeded, but not entered before the event.

Main draw wildcard entries

Men's singles
  James Duckworth
  Sam Groth
  Steve Johnson
  Thanasi Kokkinakis
  Nick Kyrgios
  Lucas Pouille
  Jordan Thompson
  Wu Di

Women's singles
  Ashleigh Barty
  Casey Dellacqua
  Jarmila Gajdošová
  Pauline Parmentier
  Olivia Rogowska
  Storm Sanders
  Tang Haochen
  Sachia Vickery

Men's doubles
  Yuki Bhambri /  Michael Venus
  Alex Bolt /  Andrew Whittington
  James Duckworth /  Matthew Ebden
  Chris Guccione /  Thanasi Kokkinakis
  Lleyton Hewitt /  Patrick Rafter
  Benjamin Mitchell /  Jordan Thompson
  Matt Reid /  Luke Saville

Women's doubles
  Monique Adamczak /  Olivia Rogowska
  Naiktha Bains /  Olivia Tjandramulia
  Jelena Dokić /  Storm Sanders
  Azra Hadzic /  Jessica Moore
  Han Xinyun /  Miki Miyamura
  Tammi Patterson /  Arina Rodionova
  Sally Peers /  Viktorija Rajicic

Mixed doubles
  Eugenie Bouchard /  Sam Groth
  Jarmila Gajdošová /  Matthew Ebden
  Arina Rodionova /  Nick Kyrgios
  Olivia Rogowska /  John-Patrick Smith
  Storm Sanders /  Chris Guccione
  Ajla Tomljanović /  James Duckworth
  Donna Vekić /  Thanasi Kokkinakis

Main draw qualifier entries

Men's singles

  Damir Džumhur
  Dominic Thiem
  David Guez
  Denis Kudla
  Dušan Lajović
  Zhang Ze
  Michael Berrer
  Frank Dancevic
  Wayne Odesnik
  Thomaz Bellucci
  Vincent Millot
  Jimmy Wang
  Rhyne Williams
  Ričardas Berankis
  Blaž Rola
  Peter Gojowczyk

Lucky losers
  Martin Kližan
  Stéphane Robert

Women's singles

  Belinda Bencic
  Carina Witthöft
  Ana Konjuh
  Zarina Diyas
  Katarzyna Piter
  Alla Kudryavtseva
  Heather Watson
  Lucie Hradecká
  Kateřina Siniaková
  Duan Yingying
  Irina-Camelia Begu
  Anna Tatishvili

Lucky loser
  Irina Falconi

Protected ranking
The following players were accepted directly into the main draw using a protected ranking:

 Women's Singles
  Chan Yung-jan (PR 88)
  Vera Zvonareva (PR 15)

Withdrawals
The following players were accepted directly into the main tournament, but withdrew with injuries, suspensions or personal reasons.

Men's Singles
 Nicolás Almagro → replaced by  Martin Kližan
 Brian Baker → replaced by  Michaël Llodra
 Philipp Kohlschreiber → replaced by  Stéphane Robert
 Jürgen Melzer → replaced by  Jan-Lennard Struff 
 Janko Tipsarević → replaced by  Jan Hájek
 Viktor Troicki → replaced by  Go Soeda
 Jürgen Zopp → replaced by  Blaž Kavčič

Women's Singles
 Jamie Hampton → replaced by  Irina Falconi
 Maria Kirilenko → replaced by  Petra Martić
 Iveta Melzer → replaced by  Yulia Putintseva
 Romina Oprandi → replaced by  Tadeja Majerič
 Nadia Petrova → replaced by  Tsvetana Pironkova
 Urszula Radwańska → replaced by  Mirjana Lučić-Baroni
 María Teresa Torró Flor → replaced by  Alison Van Uytvanck

References

External links
 Australian Open official website